Kusume Rumal 2 (translation: Pink Handkerchief 2) is a 2009 Nepali romantic film directed by Nirak Poudel, son of veteran Nepali Producer Uddab Poudel. This is not technically a sequel to the 1985 film Kusume Rumal but it pays homage to the old film and it shows the next generation where the lead actress is Suniti (Tripti)'s daughter. This was the first film for Niraj Baral, Usha Rajak, and Rubi Bhattarai.

Cast
 Niraj Baral
 Usha Rajak
 Rubi Bhattarai
 Tripti Nadakar
 Laxmi Giri
 Nikhil Upreti (special appearance)

References

Nepalese romantic drama films
2000s Nepali-language films
2009 romantic drama films
2009 films
Nepalese sequel films